Herlinatiens (born Herlina Tien Suhesti; Ngawi, Indonesia April 26, 1982) is an author from Indonesia.

Biography
Herlinatiens' first novel, Garis Tepi Seorang Lesbian, is about a lesbian who is discriminated against by her culture and family.  The book's first run sold out quickly and the publisher started a second run two weeks later.  The novel made Herlinatiens a cult leader among young women, and a champion of the gay and lesbian community. The novel is considered the "coming out" for Indonesian writings about gays and lesbians. The book caused strong controversy in Indonesia and provided thought for scholarly research.  Her second book, Dejavu, Sayap yang Pecah, also became a bestseller.

Currently, she is part of the staff and research team for Yayasan Umar Kayam, a non-profit foundation for the culture and arts in Indonesia. She lives in Yogyakarta and is working toward her master's degree in cultural studies at Sanata Dharma University.

Garis Tepi Seorang Lesbian
The book, Margins of a Lesbian in English, begins with Ashmora Paria, an Indonesian woman with three children.  She was married and living in Paris, France with her female partner, Ri. Paria and Ri have become estranged and Paria has moved back to Indonesia at the start of the book.  Paria meets Davia, a female student who has had relations with men.  At first Paria resists her feelings for Davia, but her loneliness is too strong and she starts a relationship with Devia.  Paria also has correspondence via letters with two other people, Gita, a housewife and Rafael, a Catholic priest.  The book deals with her struggle with isolationism, rumors and ultimately being marginalized.  She vents her anger and feeling through her letters to Gita and Rafael.

Bibliography

References

External links 
 (Indonesian) "Herlinatiens Blog", Ode Jari Manis
 (English) 
 

1982 births
Indonesian writers
Living people
People from Ngawi Regency
People from Yogyakarta